Henry Peckham may refer to:

 Henry Peckham (MP for Chichester) (1615–1673), English politician
 Henry Peckham (MP for Wycombe), MP for Wycombe

See also
 Harry Peckham (1740–1787), English barrister, sportsman and letter-writer